Thomas Davies Whittles (December 27, 1873 – December 6, 1950) was an American Presbyterian missionary, novelist, and college football coach. He was the author of three missionary novels based on the life of Frank E. Higgins: The Lumberjack's Sky Pilot, The Parish of the Pines, and Frank Higgins, Trail Blazer. Whittles attended Waynesburg College—now known as Waynesburg University—in Waynesburg, Pennsylvania as a pre-ministry student and organized the school's first football team, for which he played and coach. He led the 1895 team to a record of 3–0.

Whittles died on December 6, 1950, in Carlton, Minnesota.

Head coaching record

References

External links
 

1873 births
1950 deaths
20th-century American male writers
20th-century American novelists
American male novelists
American Presbyterian missionaries
Waynesburg Yellow Jackets football coaches
Waynesburg Yellow Jackets football players
Clergy from Lancashire
Sportspeople from Lancashire
Writers from Lancashire
English emigrants to the United States